A Real Live Dolly is the first live album by American singer-songwriter Dolly Parton. It was released on June 29, 1970, by RCA Victor. The album was produced by Bob Ferguson and was recorded on April 15, 1970, at Sevier County High School in Sevierville, Tennessee. It peaked at number 32 on the Billboard Top Country Albums chart and number 154 on the Billboard 200 chart.

Background
Plans for a live album were first announced in the February 28, 1970 issue of Billboard. The article stated that April 25 would be the second annual Dolly Parton Day in Parton's hometown and that she would give a benefit show at her high school alma mater to establish a scholarship fund and purchase musical instruments for students at the school. They also announced RCA's plans to record the performance for a live album. The article went on to say that two busloads of artists would make the trip from Nashville to Sevierville to take part in the benefit show.

Recording
The album was recorded on April 25, 1970, at Parton's high school alma mater, Sevier County High School in Sevierville, Tennessee. Eight songs performed that day were cut from the album's release: "Just Because I'm a Woman", "In the Good Old Days (When Times Were Bad)", "Daddy Come and Get Me", "He's a Go-Getter, "Just the Way I Am", "Coat of Many Colors", "Chicken Every Sunday", and a reprise of "Tall Man".

Release and promotion
The album was released June 29, 1970 on LP and 8-track.

Critical reception

The review published in the July 11, 1970 issue of Billboard said, "This package has a very homey quality. Dolly is recorded live, doing a show in her home town. Special guest is Porter Wagoner, and together they do several of their noted duets. The tunes include "Wabash Cannon Ball", "Two Sides to Every Story" and "How Great Thou Art". This disk is headed for big sales."

Cashbox also published a review in their July 11 issue, which said, "Dolly Parton went back to her home in Sevier County, Tennessee, recently to be feted by the local folk, to establish a Dolly Parton Scholarship Foundation and to record this album at her alma mater, Sevier County High School, whose students will receive the scholarships. Her many devotees will want to own the set, which features Porter Wagoner in four duets with the songstress. Look for big action on this one."

Record World gave a positive review of the album, saying that "Dolly's a dilly with the hometown Sevierville, Tennessee, crowd."

AllMusic rated the album 4.5 out of 5 stars.

Commercial performance
The album debuted at number 34 on the Billboard Top Country Albums chart. It would peak the following week at number 32. The album spent four weeks on the chart. It debuted and peaked at number 154 on the US Billboard Billboard 200 chart, where it remained for two weeks.

Reissues
The album was included as a bonus disc with pre-orders of Parton's career-spanning box set Dolly in October 2009. This version of the album includes four bonus tracks recorded during the April 25, 1970 performance; "Just Because I'm a Woman", "Daddy Come and Get Me" and "He's a Go Getter" and Parton's first live performance of "Coat of Many Colors". This expanded version of the album was made available as a digital download on March 23, 2010.

Track listing

Personnel
Adapted from the album liner notes and RCA recording session records.

Joseph Babcock – background vocals
Terry Blackwell – guitar
James Buchanant – fiddle
Jack Drake – guitar
Pete Drake – pedal steel
Bobby Dyson – bass
Dolores Edgin – background vocals
Bob Ferguson – producer
D.J. Fontana – drums
Johnny Gimble – fiddle
Edward Howard – guitar
Dave Kirby – guitar
Les Leverett – cover photo
Mack Magaha – fiddle
George McCormick – guitar
Al Pachucki – recording engineer
June Evelyn Page – background vocals
Dolly Parton – lead vocals
Hargus Robbins – piano
Dale Sellers – guitar
Roy Shockley – recording technician
Buck Trent – electric banjo
Hugh "Skip" Trotter – liner notes
Bill Vandevort – recording technician
Porter Wagoner – duet vocals

Charts

Release history

References

1970 live albums
Dolly Parton live albums
Albums produced by Bob Ferguson (music)
RCA Records live albums
Albums arranged by Porter Wagoner